Stanstead was a federal electoral district in Quebec, Canada, that was represented in the House of Commons of Canada from 1867 to 1968.

It was created by the British North America Act, 1867. It consisted initially of the Townships of Stanstead, Barnston, Hatley, Barford, and Magog East and West.

In 1924, it was redefined to exclude the part of the municipality of St. Herménégilde lying in the township of Hereford.

In 1947, it was redefined to consist of:
 the county of Stanstead, (except the municipality and the village of St. Herménégilde), and the towns of Coaticook and Magog;
 the town of Lennoxville and the south-eastern parts of the county of Sherbrooke, and the municipality of Compton and the villages of Compton and Waterville.

The electoral district was abolished in 1966 when it was redistributed into Compton, Missisquoi, Shefford and Sherbrooke ridings.

Members of Parliament

This riding elected the following Members of Parliament:

Election results

See also 
 List of Canadian federal electoral districts
 Past Canadian electoral districts

External links 
 Riding history from the Library of Parliament
The Colbys of Stanstead

Former federal electoral districts of Quebec